Cottonwood Mall may refer to:
Cottonwood Mall (Albuquerque, New Mexico)
Cottonwood Mall (Holladay, Utah)